Ophiocordyceps is a genus of fungi within the family Ophiocordycipitaceae. The widespread genus, first described scientifically by British mycologist Tom Petch in 1931, contains about 140 species that grow on insects. Anamorphic genera that correspond with Ophiocordyceps species are Hirsutella, Hymenostilbe, Isaria, Paraisaria, and Syngliocladium.

One species complex, Ophiocordyceps unilateralis, is known for its parasitism on ants, in which it alters the behavior of the ants in such a way as to propagate itself more effectively, killing the ant and then growing its fruiting bodies from the ant's head and releasing its spores. A 48-million-year-old fossil of an ant in the death-grip of Ophiocordyceps unilateralis was discovered in Germany.

Ophiocordyceps is a parasitic fungus also known as zombie fungus, they usually grow inside the body of insect and end up killing it by affecting the vital organs.

Sources and uses
Ophiocordyceps sinensis is a species that infects the larvae of moths, mostly ants, and has been used in traditional Chinese medicine.  Although some research says it contains anti-inflammatory effects however, there is currently no scientific evidence that use of this species has any clinically detectable effect on human diseases.

Species

Ophiocordyceps arborescens
Ophiocordyceps acicularis
Ophiocordyceps agriotidis
Ophiocordyceps ainictos
Ophiocordyceps amazonica
Ophiocordyceps amazonica var. neoamazonica
Ophiocordyceps aphodii
Ophiocordyceps appendiculata
Ophiocordyceps arachneicola
Ophiocordyceps araracuarensis
Ophiocordyceps arbuscula
Ophiocordyceps armeniaca
Ophiocordyceps asyuënsis
Ophiocordyceps aurantia
Ophiocordyceps australis
Ophiocordyceps barnesii
Ophiocordyceps bicephala
Ophiocordyceps brunneipunctata
Ophiocordyceps bispora
Ophiocordyceps blattae
Ophiocordyceps blattarioides
Ophiocordyceps caloceroides
Ophiocordyceps camponoti-balzani
Ophiocordyceps camponoti-chartificis
Ophiocordyceps camponoti-floridani
Ophiocordyceps camponoti-melanotici
Ophiocordyceps camponoti-novogranadensis
Ophiocordyceps camponoti-rufipedis
Ophiocordyceps camponoti-sexguttati
Ophiocordyceps cantharelloides
Ophiocordyceps carabidicola
Ophiocordyceps cicadicola
Ophiocordyceps clavata
Ophiocordyceps clavulata
Ophiocordyceps coccidiicola
Ophiocordyceps coccigena
Ophiocordyceps cochlidiicola
Ophiocordyceps coenomyia
Ophiocordyceps communis
Ophiocordyceps corallomyces
Ophiocordyceps crassispora
Ophiocordyceps crinalis
Ophiocordyceps cuboidea
Ophiocordyceps cucumispora
Ophiocordyceps cucumispora var.  dolichoderi
Ophiocordyceps curculionum
Ophiocordyceps cylindrostromata
Ophiocordyceps daceti
Ophiocordyceps dayiensis
Ophiocordyceps dermapterigena
Ophiocordyceps dipterigena
Ophiocordyceps discoideicapitata
Ophiocordyceps ditmarii
Ophiocordyceps dovei
Ophiocordyceps elateridicola
Ophiocordyceps elongata
Ophiocordyceps elongatiperitheciata
Ophiocordyceps elongatistromata
Ophiocordyceps emeiensis
Ophiocordyceps engleriana
Ophiocordyceps entomorrhiza
Ophiocordyceps evansii
Ophiocordyceps evdogeorgiae
Ophiocordyceps falcata
Ophiocordyceps falcatoides
Ophiocordyceps fasciculatistromata
Ophiocordyceps ferruginosa
Ophiocordyceps filiformis
Ophiocordyceps formicarum
Ophiocordyceps forquignonii
Ophiocordyceps fulgoromorphila
Ophiocordyceps furcicaudata
Ophiocordyceps gansuënsis
Ophiocordyceps geniculata
Ophiocordyceps gentilis
Ophiocordyceps glaziovii
Ophiocordyceps goniophora
Ophiocordyceps gracilioides
Ophiocordyceps gracilis
Ophiocordyceps gryllotalpae
Ophiocordyceps halabalaensis
Ophiocordyceps heteropoda
Ophiocordyceps hirsutellae
Ophiocordyceps hiugensis
Ophiocordyceps huberiana
Ophiocordyceps humbertii
Ophiocordyceps insignis
Ophiocordyceps irangiensis
Ophiocordyceps japonensis
Ophiocordyceps jiangxiensis
Ophiocordyceps jinggangshanensis
Ophiocordyceps kangdingensis
Ophiocordyceps kniphofioides
Ophiocordyceps kniphofioides var. dolichoderi
Ophiocordyceps kniphofioides var. monacidis
Ophiocordyceps kniphofioides var. ponerinarum
Ophiocordyceps koningsbergeri
Ophiocordyceps konnoana
Ophiocordyceps lachnopoda
Ophiocordyceps laojunshanensis
Ophiocordyceps larvarum
Ophiocordyceps larvicola
Ophiocordyceps lloydii
Ophiocordyceps lloydii var.  binata
Ophiocordyceps longissima
Ophiocordyceps lutea
Ophiocordyceps macroacicularis
Ophiocordyceps macularis
Ophiocordyceps melolonthae
Ophiocordyceps melolonthae var. rickii
Ophiocordyceps michiganensis
Ophiocordyceps minutissima
Ophiocordyceps monticola
Ophiocordyceps mrciensis
Ophiocordyceps multiaxialis
Ophiocordyceps myrmecophila
Ophiocordyceps myrmicarum
Ophiocordyceps naomipierceae
Ophiocordyceps neovolkiana
Ophiocordyceps nepalensis
Ophiocordyceps nigra
Ophiocordyceps nigrella
Ophiocordyceps nigripes
Ophiocordyceps nutans
Ophiocordyceps obtusa
Ophiocordyceps octospora
Ophiocordyceps odonatae
Ophiocordyceps oecophyllae
Ophiocordyceps osuzumontana
Ophiocordyceps owariensis
Ophiocordyceps owariensis f. viridescens
Ophiocordyceps oxycephala
Ophiocordyceps paludosa
Ophiocordyceps paracuboidea
Ophiocordyceps pentatomae
Ophiocordyceps petchii
Ophiocordyceps proliferans
Ophiocordyceps prolifica
Ophiocordyceps pruinosa
Ophiocordyceps pseudolloydii
Ophiocordyceps pseudolongissima
Ophiocordyceps pulvinata
Ophiocordyceps purpureostromata
Ophiocordyceps purpureostromata f.  recurvata
Ophiocordyceps ravenelii
Ophiocordyceps rhizoidea
Ophiocordyceps ridleyi
Ophiocordyceps robertsii - Vegetable caterpillar, āwheto 
Ophiocordyceps rubripunctata
Ophiocordyceps rubiginosiperitheciata
Ophiocordyceps ryogamiensis
Ophiocordyceps salebrosa
Ophiocordyceps satoi
Ophiocordyceps scottiana
Ophiocordyceps selkirkii
Ophiocordyceps sichuanensis
Ophiocordyceps smithii
Ophiocordyceps sobolifera
Ophiocordyceps sinensis - Caterpillar fungus, chong cao
Ophiocordyceps sphecocephala
Ophiocordyceps stipillata
Ophiocordyceps stylophora
Ophiocordyceps subflavida
Ophiocordyceps subunilateralis
Ophiocordyceps superficialis
Ophiocordyceps superficialis f.  crustacea
Ophiocordyceps takaoënsis
Ophiocordyceps taylorii
Ophiocordyceps thyrsoides
Ophiocordyceps tiputini
Ophiocordyceps tricentri
Ophiocordyceps truncata
Ophiocordyceps uchiyamae
Ophiocordyceps unilateralis
Ophiocordyceps unilateralis var. clavata
Ophiocordyceps variabilis
Ophiocordyceps voeltzkowii
Ophiocordyceps volkiana
Ophiocordyceps wuyishanensis
Ophiocordyceps yakusimensis
Ophiocordyceps zhangjiajiensis

In popular culture
Simply referred to as "cordyceps", an unspecified species is the cause of a worldwide pandemic and the zombie-like "infected" in the 2013 video game The Last of Us and its 2023 television adaptation. 

In the 2014 novel The Girl with All the Gifts and its 2016 film adaptation, a mutation of Ophiocordyceps unilateralis is responsible for an infection that causes the collapse of civilization.

See also
 Cordyceps

References

External links

Hypocreales genera
Ophiocordycipitaceae
Parasites of Hymenoptera
Taxa described in 1931
Taxa named by Thomas Petch